David Mackenzie Crean (born 21 November 1950, Melbourne) is a former Labor member of the Parliament of Tasmania. He is the son of former Deputy Prime Minister Frank Crean and brother to former Australian federal opposition leader Simon Crean.

Before entering politics, Crean was a medical doctor in Hobart, where he started the city's first after-hours medical locum practice with his business partner, future federal opposition leader Brendan Nelson. His first wife was Jill Robson, daughter of fellow politician Neil Robson.

Crean entered the House of Assembly at the 1989 election in the division of Denison. He was defeated at the 1992 election held in February 1992. In May 1992 he was elected to the Legislative Council in the division of Buckingham (later becoming Elwick).

Crean retired in May 2004 due to a kidney condition. He was Chair of Hydro Tasmania from September 2004 until his resignation in 2014. His partner is former senator, Sue Mackay.

References

Living people
1950 births
Australian people of Irish descent
Members of the Tasmanian House of Assembly
Members of the Tasmanian Legislative Council
Treasurers of Tasmania
Australian Labor Party members of the Parliament of Tasmania
20th-century Australian politicians
21st-century Australian politicians
Politicians from Melbourne